The 1991 James Madison Dukes football team represented James Madison University as an independent during the 1991 NCAA Division I-AA football season. Led by first-year head coach Rip Scherer, the Duke played their home games at Bridgeforth Stadium in Harrisonburg, Virginia. James Madison finished the season with an overall record of 9–4.

Schedule

References

James Madison
James Madison Dukes football seasons
James Madison Dukes football